Penny Paradise is a 1938 British comedy film directed by Carol Reed and starring Edmund Gwenn, Betty Driver and Jimmy O'Dea. It was an early directorial assignment for Reed, and along with many other British productions of the era such as the same year's better-known Reed-directed Bank Holiday, is described as: "...belonging to a wider studio tradition of modest representation of ordinary British life."

Plot
The film is set in Liverpool, where tugboat captain Joe Higgins (Edmund Gwenn), believing he has won £20,000 on the football pools, resigns from his job and throws a party in a local public house where family and friends – some of whom have an eye on a share of the winnings – gather to celebrate his good luck.  Higgins pays court to the widow Clegg (Maire O'Neill) who he has been wooing, while his daughter Betty (Betty Driver) is targeted by a chancer who wants her money.  The party grinds to a halt with the arrival of the hapless Pat (Jimmy O'Dea), Higgins' Irish first mate on the tugboat, who is forced to admit that he forgot to post the winning pools coupon.  There now seems no reason for celebration, but Higgins is mollified when his former employer offers him the captaincy of the best tugboat on the River Mersey, a position to which he had long aspired.

The action of the film is interspersed with several musical numbers performed by Driver and one by O'Dea.  Whilst O'Dea's song is clearly provided for comic effect, those sung by Driver are presented straight.

Cast
 Edmund Gwenn as Joe Higgins
 Betty Driver as Betty Higgins
 Jimmy O'Dea as Pat
 Ethel Coleridge as Aunt Agnes
 Maire O'Neill as Widow Clegg
 Syd Crossley as Uncle Lancelot
 James Harcourt as Amos Cook
 Jack Livesey as Bert
 Frederick Burtwell as Policeman

References

External links 
 
 
 

1938 films
1938 comedy films
British comedy films
Films directed by Carol Reed
British black-and-white films
Films set in Liverpool
Associated Talking Pictures
1930s English-language films
1930s British films